Endzeit may refer to:

 End time (disambiguation)
 Endzeit Bunkertracks